Drunk with Passion is the fifth album by the Golden Palominos. It was released in 1991 via Nation/Charisma.

Critical reception
Spin praised Bob Mould's turn on "Dying From the Inside Out", but deemed the rest of the album "an overlong, overproduced mess." New York called it "art rock for aging post-punks." The Orlando Sentinel wrote that "Fier now seems to be sleepwalking toward New Age territory."

Track listing 
All songs written by Amanda Kramer, Anton Fier and Nicky Skopelitis, except where noted

Personnel 
Musicians
Amanda Kramer – vocals, keyboards
Anton Fier – drums, percussion, keyboards on "Hands of Heaven" and "Begin to Return", production
Bill Laswell – bass guitar, fretless bass on "A Sigh"
Nicky Skopelitis – guitar, acoustic guitar, Dobro guitar on "Alive and Living Now"
Guest Musicians
Carla Bley – Hammond organ on "Alive and Living Now" and "When the Kingdom Calls"
Aïyb Dieng – percussion on "A Sigh" and "Hands of Heaven"
Robert Kidney – vocals and guitar on "Begin to Return"
Bob Mould – vocals and guitar on "Dying From the Inside Out"
Michael Stipe – vocals on "Alive and Living Now"
Richard Thompson – guitar on "Alive and Living Now", "The Haunting", "When the Kingdom Calls", "Hands of Heaven" and "Dying from the Inside Out"
Production and additional personnel
Chris Bigg – illustrations, design
David Cook – mixing on "A Sigh", recording
Oz Fritz – recording
Mike Krowiak – mixing, recording
Jeff Lippay – mixing
Tom Mark – recording
Steve McLoughlin – recording
Robert Musso – recording
Wes Naprstek – recording
Vaughan Oliver – illustrations, design
Howie Weinberg – mastering
John Yates – mixing on "A Sigh"
Billy Youdelman – recording

References

External links 
 

1991 albums
The Golden Palominos albums
Albums produced by Anton Fier